Creekside Community High School is a public high school located in Tigard, Oregon, United States. Formerly the Durham Education Center, the alternative high school accepts students in grades 9-12, while also a part of the Tigard-Tualatin School District. The school formally opened for the 2019-2020 school year. As outlined by the Hands-on Learning PDF, Creekside Community aims to  "lead the way towards a future of holistic community health." 

Creekside Community offers a paid internship with the SupaFresh Youth Farm  The farm employs up to 50 youth per year in paid internships that include Work Readiness Training, Leadership Development and Support Services. The hands-on, student-centered approach to learning at the farm empowers and supports youth to learn by doing.

History

Demographics
The demographic breakdown of the 165 students enrolled in 2020-21 was:
Male - 57%
Female - 43%
Native American/Alaskan Native - 0.6%
Asian - 0.0%
Black - 0.0%
Hispanic - 32.7%
Native Hawaiian/Pacific Islander - 6.1%
White - 52.1%
Multiracial - 8.4%

References

Tigard, Oregon
High schools in Washington County, Oregon
Alternative schools in Oregon